The Enders was a French automobile manufactured from 1911 until 1923.  A small cyclecar designed by a M. Violet, it ran on a two-stroke 500 cc engine.

References

Cyclecars
Defunct motor vehicle manufacturers of France